In human nutrition, empty calories are those calories found in beverages (including alcoholic) and foods composed primarily or solely of sugars and/or certain fats and oils such as cholesterol, saturated or trans fats, that provide little to no useful nutrients such as protein, fibre, vitamins, minerals, essential fatty acids, or antioxidants Foods composed mostly of empty calories have low nutrient density, meaning few nutrients relative to their energy content. The consumption of large amounts of empty calories can have negative health consequences.

Research 
The lack of adequate nutrition found in high energy foods was first scientifically tested by French physiologist François Magendie, who experimented on dogs and described the process in his book Précis élémentaire de Physiologie. He demonstrated that the eating of sugar, olive oil, or butter could be the cause of the death of his test animals within 30 to 40 days.

Examples
The following foods are often considered to contain mostly empty calories and may lead to body weight gain.
 Sugar: such as cakes, cookies, sweets, candy, soft drinks, fruit-flavored sweet beverages, and other foods containing mostly added sugars, including high-fructose corn syrup.
 Fat: such as margarine, shortening, other fats, and oils and foods high in them such as potato chips and most other deep fried and processed foods.
 Alcohol: such as beer, wine, spirits, and other alcoholic beverages. While moderate amounts can lead to body weight gain, chronic consumption of large amounts of alcohol can lead to body weight loss because alcoholic liver disease (ALD) is characterized by an increased metabolic rate and impaired muscle protein synthesis, resulting in sarcopenia.

Impact on other nutrients
A diet high in added sugar typically leads to reduced consumption of foods that contain essential nutrients. One study reported that when there was increased consumption of added sugars, nutrients at most risk for deficiency were magnesium and vitamins A, C, E. Intake of these nutrients dropped with each 5% increase in added sugar intake.

A diet high in alcohol can have the same effect, although in this case the nutrients at particular risk of deficiency are zinc, vitamin D, thiamine, folate, cyanocobalamin, and selenium. People with ALD also develop sarcopenia, but it is not clear if this is due to chronic low protein intake or the disease, which is known to inhibit muscle protein synthesis.

Threshold for health impact
Food intake must be balanced with physical activity to maintain healthy body weight. Sedentary individuals and those eating less to lose weight may experience malnutrition if they eat food primarily composed of empty calories. In contrast, people who engage in heavier physical activity need more food energy as fuel and can have a larger amount of calorie-rich, essential nutrient-poor foods. Dietitians and other healthcare professionals can prevent malnutrition by designing eating programs and recommending dietary modifications according to each patient's needs.

The USDA advises the following levels of empty calorie consumption as an upper limit for individuals who engage in 30 minutes or less of moderate exercise daily.

See also
Junk food
Whole food

References

External links
 

Nutrition